The East Atlantic Gymnastics League (EAGL) is a collegiate women's gymnastics conference competing at the NCAA Division I level. The league comprises eight universities.

Members

Former members

History
EAGL was formed on July 31, 1995, when eight universities on the East Coast of the United States: the University of Maryland, the University of New Hampshire, the University of North Carolina at Chapel Hill, North Carolina State University, the University of Pittsburgh, Rutgers University, Towson University, and West Virginia University joined to form a conference solely for women’s gymnastics. In August 1996, the EAGL officially became an affiliated member of the NCAA.

George Washington University joined the league in 2004. Towson, one of the original league members, left EAGL in 2005 to rejoin the Eastern College Athletic Conference.  On February 3, 2012, the Atlantic Coast Conference announced that with the addition of Pittsburgh to the conference it would begin sponsoring a gymnastics championship, withdrawing the membership of the Maryland, North Carolina, North Carolina State, and Pittsburgh from the EAGL. However, Rutgers and Maryland both joined the Big Ten in 2014, a conference with an established gymnastics championship. West Virginia left the EAGL in 2012 upon joining the Big 12, a conference that also sponsored gymnastics. As such, not enough schools fielding gymnastics teams remained in the ACC for that conference to sponsor gymnastics so North Carolina, NC State, and Pitt remained in the EAGL. Towson rejoined the league in 2013. On March 5, 2020, Long Island University announced plans to add a women's gymnastics team for the 2020-21 school year and join the EAGL. On November 14, 2020,  Temple University announced it would be leaving the Eastern Collegiate Athletic Conference to join the EAGL.

On June 17, 2021, the Atlantic Coast Conference announced that, with the addition of NCAA Gymnastics at  Clemson University, the ACC would begin sponsoring the sport for the 2023-24 school year, which will move Pittsburgh, North Carolina State and North Carolina from the EAGL to the ACC starting with the 2024 season.

Team champions

See also
 NCAA Women's Gymnastics championship

References

 
NCAA Division I conferences
Sports leagues established in 1995
1995 in gymnastics